Alfarelos is a civil parish in the municipality of Soure, Portugal. The population in 2011 was 1,439, in an area of 13.98 km².

References

Freguesias of Soure, Portugal